The Oil Platforms case (formally, Oil Platforms (Islamic Republic of Iran v. United States of America) ICJ 4) is a public international law case decided by the International Court of Justice in 2003 in which Iran challenged the U.S. Navy's destruction of three oil platforms in the Persian Gulf in 1987-1988. The Court affirmed that it could exercise jurisdiction over the case based on the 1955 Treaty of Amity, Economic Relations and Consular Rights between the United States and Iran but decided with strong majorities against both Iran's claim and the United States' counterclaim.

Facts
In November 1992, Iran filed a claim before the ICJ, alleging that the U.S. Navy's actions constituted a violation of the 1955 U.S.-Iranian Treaty of Amity, Economic Relations and Consular Rights (United States–Iran) and a violation of international law. The United States filed a preliminary objection challenging the Court's jurisdiction over the case and also filed a counter-claim that Iran had also breached its obligations under the Treaty of Amity for attacking vessels in the Persian Gulf and for endangering commerce and navigation in the area.

Judgments
On December 12, 1996, the Court rejected the U.S. preliminary objection to the Court's jurisdiction, by a vote of fourteen to two, holding that it could exercise jurisdiction under the Treaty of Amity.  The two dissenters were Vice President Stephen Schwebel (nationality: U.S.) and Judge Oda (Japan), each of whom wrote dissenting opinions.  Among the majority, separate opinions were appended by Judges Shahabuddeen (Guyana), Ranjeva (Madagascar), Higgins (U.K.), and Parra-Aranguren (Venezuela), and Judge ad hoc Rigaux (Belgium, appointed by Iran).  

On March 10, 1998, the Court held that the U.S. counter-claim against Iran, for mining and other attacks on U.S. shipping, was also admissible.

Oral arguments were held between February 17 and March 7, 2003.

On November 6, 2003, 11 years after the initial application was submitted by Iran, the ICJ rejected the claims of both states. First, the Court found by a vote of 14-2 (dissenting Judges Al-Khasawneh (Jordan), Elaraby (Egypt)) that the U.S. actions against Iranian oil platforms in 1987 and 1988 could not be justified under the treaty's essential security exception but that they did not breach the treaty's freedom of commerce provision because, at the time, the oil platforms were under repair and non-operational and, thus, the attack did not affect freedom of commerce between the United States and Iran.  Thus, Iran's claim against the United States could not be upheld.  Second, the Court found by a vote of 15-1 (dissenting Judge Simma (Germany)) that the U.S. counter-claim against Iran could not be upheld for similar reasons:  the vessels attacked by Iran were not shown to have been engaged in any commerce between the United States and Iran and thus did not impede commerce or navigation between the parties.  (Paragraph 125 of the Decision.)  Eleven judges attached declarations or separate opinions.

See also
 List of International Court of Justice cases
 Iran–Iraq War#U.S. military actions toward Iran

References

International Court of Justice cases
Iran–United States relations
2003 in international relations
2003 in case law
2003 in the United States
2003 in Iran